Dimitar Koemdzhiev (born 28 September 1978) is a Bulgarian footballer.

Playing career 
Koemdzhiev began playing in 1999 in the Bulgarian A Football Group with Pirin Blagoevgrad. After the relegation of Pirin he signed with Spartak-Pleven in 2001. In 2002, he played with FC Marek Dupnitsa, and featured in the 2003 UEFA Intertoto Cup against Videoton FC. He returned to Blagoevgrad in 2006 to play in the Bulgarian B Football Group, and secured promotion within the same season. He later had stints with Vihren Sandanski, and a third term with Blagoevgrad in 2011. 

In 2011, he played with FC Montana, and subsequently with FC Septemvri Simitli in 2012. In 2016, he played abroad in the Canadian Soccer League with Brantford Galaxy. After two seasons in Brantford he was traded to Real Mississauga SC in 2018.

References

External links
 

1978 births
Living people
Bulgarian footballers
OFC Pirin Blagoevgrad players
PFC Spartak Pleven players
PFC Marek Dupnitsa players
PFC Pirin Blagoevgrad players
OFC Vihren Sandanski players
FC Montana players
FC Septemvri Simitli players
First Professional Football League (Bulgaria) players

Association football defenders
Brantford Galaxy players
Canadian Soccer League (1998–present) players